Supply chain resilience is "the adaptive capability of the supply chain to prepare for unexpected events, respond to disruptions, and recover from them by maintaining continuity of operations at the desired level of connectedness and control over structure and function".

Origins 

Since around the turn of the millennium, supply chain risk management has attempted to transfer traditional risk management approaches from the "company" system to the "supply chain" system. However, the scalability of the traditional steps of risk management (identification, assessment, treatment and monitoring of risks) quickly reaches its limits: It is entirely possible to identify all conceivable risks within a company; However, a supply chain often consists of thousands of companies – the attempt to identify all possible risks in this system is therefore much more complex, if not in vain. It is a popular concept in contemporary supply chain management. It has therefore been argued that the complexity of supply chains requires complementary measures such as supply chain resilience. Resilience is able to cope with all sorts of changes and is thus less about the identification of specific risks but more about the characteristics of the system.

Interpretations of supply chain resilience

Resilience in the sense of engineering resilience 
For a long time, the interpretation of resilience in the sense of engineering resilience prevailed in supply chain management. It is implied here that a supply chain is a closed system that can be controlled, similar to a system designed and planned by engineers (e.g. subway network). The expectations placed on managers come close to those placed on engineers, who should react quickly in the event of a disturbance in order to restore the system's ideal and original state as quickly as possible. A popular implementation of this idea in supply chain management is given by measuring the time-to-survive and the time-to-recover of the supply chain, allowing to identify weak points in the system. Acting like an engineer by redesigning the supply chain like on the drawing board, often by creating redundancies (e.g. multiple sourcing), strengthens resilience. In the short term, a supply chain can be viewed as a relatively rigid system. The idea of persistence of a supply chain that follows from engineering resilience therefore makes sense in the short term. However, this approach has its limits in the mid to long term.

Resilience in the sense of socio-ecological resilience 

Social-ecological resilience goes back to ecological resilience, adding to it human decision-makers and their social interactions. A supply chain is thus interpreted as a social-ecological system that – similar to an ecosystem (e.g. forest) – is able to constantly adapt to external environmental conditions and – through the presence of social actors and their ability to foresight – also to transform itself into a fundamentally new system. This leads to a panarchical interpretation of a supply chain, embedding it into a system of systems, allowing to analyze the interactions of the supply chain with systems that operate at other levels (e.g. society, political economy, planet Earth). For example, Tesla's supply chain can be described as resilient because it reflects the transformation from internal combustion engines to electric engines, which is based on the ability of human actors to foresee long-term changes in the planet in the context of the climate crisis and to implement them in a business model. In contrast to engineering resilience, the supply chain is not interpreted as a system that needs to be stabilized in a fixed state (focus: persistence), but as a fluid system or even as a fluid process that interacts with the rest of the world (focus: adaptation or even transformation).

Literature 
 Sheffi, Y. (2007). The resilient enterprise: overcoming vulnerability for competitive advantage. Zone Books.
 Kummer, S. et al. (2022). Supply Chain Resilience: Insights from Theory and Practice (Springer Series in Supply Chain Management)

References 

Supply chain management
Risk management